Bedeyeva Polyana is a rural locality (a selo) and the administrative centre of Bedeyevo-Polyansky Selsoviet, Blagoveshchensky District, Bashkortostan, Russia. The population was 1,757 as of 2010. There are 17 streets.

Geography 
Bedeyeva Polyana is located 48 km northeast of Blagoveshchensk (the district's administrative centre) by road. Pushkino is the nearest rural locality.

References 

Rural localities in Blagoveshchensky District